The College of Arts and Architecture is one of fourteen academic colleges at the University Park campus of The Pennsylvania State University.

History 
Under Eric Walker, twelfth president of Penn State, the University system experienced a revival in the importance of the humanities and fine arts, which culminated in the creation of the College of Arts and Architecture by action of the Board of Trustees in 1962. The College was formed by joining the School of Fine and Applied Arts, formerly within the College of the Liberal Arts, with the Department of Architecture, formerly within the College of Engineering. Jules Heller, then the director of the School of Fine and Applied Arts, was named the first Dean of the College.

Composition

Schools and departments 
 Department of Art History
 H. Campbell and Eleanor R. Stuckeman School of Architecture and Landscape Architecture
 School of Music
 School of Theatre
 School of Visual Arts

Outreach programs 
In addition to its academic mission, the Penn State and greater State College area is supported by cultural outreach programs administered by the College:
 Center for the Performing Arts
 The Center for the Performing Arts is the successor to the Penn State Artists Series, founded in 1957 to present a variety of artistic performances on Penn State's campus. The Center hosts a series of musical and theatrical events annually.
 Palmer Museum of Art
 The Palmer Museum of Art, opened in University Park in 1972, hosts a permanent collection of approximately 8,200 works, in addition to periodic rotating exhibitions and educational programs.
 Penn State Centre Stage
 Penn State Centre Stage is the professional arm of the School of Theatre and has its origins in the late 1950s, when theatre department head (and, later, second Dean of the College) Walter H. Walters established a program for current students and professionals to present plays at the on-campus theatre, the Pavilion.
 Penn's Woods Music Festival
 The Penn's Woods Music Festival (or Music at Penn's Woods) was established in 1986 to present a summer professional orchestral and chamber music festival organized by the School of Music.

List of deans of the College of Arts and Architecture 
Source: Penn State

References

External links 
 Penn State College of Arts and Architecture

Pennsylvania State University colleges
1963 establishments in Pennsylvania